The women's 48 kilograms weightlifting event is the lightest women's event at the weightlifting competition, limiting competitors to a maximum of 48 kilograms of body mass. The competition took place on August 9 at 10:00 and was the first Weightlifting event to conclude. It was the second set of medals to be awarded at the Games, a few moments after the women's 10m Air Rifle.

Each lifter performed in both the snatch and clean and jerk lifts, with the final score being the sum of the lifter's best result in each. The athlete received three attempts in each of the two lifts; the score for the lift was the heaviest weight successfully lifted.

Chen Xiexia and Sibel Özkan initially won the gold and the silver medals, but in 2016 their results were annulled due to a doping violation from a reanalysis of samples from 2008.

Schedule 
All times are China Standard Time (UTC+08:00)

Records

Results 

 Chen Xiexia of China originally won the gold medal, but she was disqualified following a positive anti-doping test of her 2008 sample.
 Sibel Özkan of Turkey originally won the silver medal, but she was disqualified following a positive anti-doping test of her 2008 sample. On 1 December 2016, the Court of Arbitration for Sport dismissed Özkan's final appeal.

New records

References 

 Page 2627

Weightlifting at the 2008 Summer Olympics
Women's events at the 2008 Summer Olympics
Olymp